Durbuk or Darbuk, is a village and the headquarters of the eponymous subdivision and block in the Leh district of Ladakh, India. It is located in the Durbuk tehsil, and falls between Chang La mountain pass and Tangste village on the way to Pangong Tso Lake.

Darbok is a strategic location as the 255 km long Darbuk–Shyok–DBO Road in the north, connects it to the Shyok village village 16 km away and beyond to Daulat Beg Oldi (DBO) military post on the China border.

Geography 

Durbuk is at a key location between the Indus Valley to the west, the Shyok Valley to the east and the Pangong Lake region to the south.  The trade routes to Yarkand (via the Shyok Valley) as well as Rudok (via the Pangong Lake) passed through here.

Durbuk lies in the valley of the Tangtse River, which is described as "well-cultivated" in the British sources. The river is also said to be swarming with fish.  Godwin-Austen believed that the valley must have been the bed of a lake at some point in the past.

The Tangtse River originates in the Loi Yogma valley to the southwest of Tangtse, and flows past the Tangtse and Durbuk villages to join the Shyok River. After Durbuk, the river bends sharply to the right and flows in a 400–500 m. gorge for 12 km. At Durbuk, it also receives on the left a small stream that originates below the Chang La.

In historical sources Durbuk is sometimes referred to as "Dumra" (Ldum-ra or Nubra), which is really the name of the Shyok River valley. It is possible that Durbuk might have been part of the Nubra chieftaincies in the past. Alexander Cunningham includes Durbuk within Nubra.

Transportation 
In the preset time, Durbuk is connected to all parts of Ladakh by road. A southwest road to Karu connects it to the Indus river valley, thence to Leh and Kargil. Another southeast road connects it to the Pangong Tso and Chushul. A northwest road along the western branch of the Shyok River connects it to Diskit and Turtuk.

The 235 km long Darbuk–Shyok–DBO Road in the north, connects it to places on the eastern branch of the Shyok River, including the Shyok village 16 km to the north and further north to Daulat Beg Oldi (DBO) military post on the China border. The stretch between Shyok and DBO is also called Sub-Sector North (SSN) by the Indian Military, and is off-limits to civilians.

Villages in Durbuk subdivision 

 Kargyam
 Man Pangong
 Shachukul
 Tangste
 Chushul
 Durbuk

Demographics
According to the 2011 census of India, Durbuk has 160 households. The effective literacy rate (i.e. the literacy rate of population excluding children aged 6 and below) is 66.62%.

See also
 India-China Border Roads
 Line of Actual Control
 Sino-Indian border dispute 
 List of disputed territories of India

Notes

References

Bibliography 
 
 
 
 
 
 

Villages in Durbuk tehsil